American Falls may refer to:

American Falls, the American channel of Niagara Falls
American Falls, Idaho, a city in the US
American Falls Dam, a dam and reservoir on the Snake River
American Falls High School, Idaho
American Falls, a Civil War-era novel by  John Calvin Batchelor